Babak Payami (born 1966) is an Iranian-Canadian film director, writer and producer.

Biography
Born in Tehran, Iran, Payami grew up in Afghanistan and Iran before leaving for Europe and subsequently Canada, where he became a Canadian citizen. He enrolled in the cinema studies program at the University of Toronto in the early 90s while working as translator and court interpreter. 

In 1998 he returned to Iran where he wrote, produced and directed his debut feature film One More Day, which premiered in the official Panorama Special program of the Berlin International Film Festival 2000. He later wrote, directed and co-produced with Marco Mueller, his second feature film, Secret Ballot, which competed in the official program of the Venice International Film Festival in 2001.  It earned him several accolades in Venice, including the Best Director award.

In 2002 Payami began production on Silence Between Two Thoughts, which he wrote, directed and produced in the remote areas of eastern Iran close to the borders of Afghanistan and Pakistan. It was completed after a difficult 73-day shoot. Payami was eventually arrested by Iranian officials during its editing. All original negative and sound material for Silence Between Two Thoughts was confiscated by the Iranian government, and Payami was forced into exile during the summer of 2003. A working copy of the film was salvaged on a hard disk, and with help from fellow Italian filmmakers, Payami released a reconstructed version of the film in the official program of the Venice International Film festival.

In 2003, he was a member of the jury at the 25th Moscow International Film Festival.

Since his exile, Payami has taught at the Ludwigsburg Film Academy in Germany, and conducted numerous workshops in Italy and North America while developing his English-language film projects. In late 2007 and until January 2010, he was the creative director of the Media Studio at Fabrica, a United Colors of Benetton Communication Arts research Centre in Northern Italy, where he produced several projects including I Am Jesus, directed by Valerie Gudenus and Heloisa Sartorato; and Branding Kosovo, directed by Diego Hurtado de Mendoza.

In 2006, Payami reestablished Payam Films Inc. in Toronto with his partner Charles Wachsberg, and began development of several projects, including an original story he wrote on Caravaggio, titled "Chiaroscuro"; his adaptation of a Chingiz Aitmatov book, "The Eternal Day"; and "Mina" and "Assassiyun", which he co-wrote with Toronto writer Ian Carpenter. 

In 2017 Babak Payami directed Manhattan Undying, a Canadian feature film with American stars Luke Grimes and Sarah Roemer and Canadian veteran actors Daniel Kash and Earl Pastko. It was released by Paramount Pictures and EOne in Europe and North America.

Payami also co-wrote and, with Michele Fuzellier, co-directed a French-Italian animated feature film, The Story of a Fearless Child, that was released internationally in 2016.

In 2010 Payami established Payam Entertainment as a result of his recent collaborations with Iranian musician, composer and performer Mohsen Namjoo. Payami produced several concerts for Namjoo at the Los Angeles Disney Hall, Toronto Sony Centre and the Milan Conservatory; and Namjoo's albums "OY" in 2009 (a Fabrica Production), "Useless Kisses" in 2010 (A Payam Ent. Inc. Production), "Alaki" in 2011 (A Payam Ent. Inc. Production) and "OY Live in Milan DVD" (A Fabrica/Payam Ent. Inc. co-production).

Since 2012, Payami has been the artistic advisor to Canada's Tirgan Festival, the largest Iranian festival outside of Iran.

in 2018, Payam Films optioned the motion picture rights to The Bishop's Man, a Canadian best seller by renowned Canadian author Linden MacIntyre. Payam has written the screenplay (of the same title), and the film was slated to start pre-production in late 2020.

Filmography 
 One More Day (1999)
 Secret Ballot (2001)
 Silence between Two Thoughts (2003)
 Iqbal, l'enfant qui n'avait pas peur (2015)
 Manhattan Undying (2016)
 752 Is Not a Number (2022)

Awards and honors 

 Best Artistic Contribution, Tokyo Film Festival, 2000
 Special Jury Award (One More Day), Torino Film Festival, 2000
 Best Director, Venice Film Festival, 2001
 OCIC Award (Secret Ballot), Venice, 2001
 Pasinetti Award (Secret Ballot), Venice, 2001
 UNICEF Award (Secret Ballot), Venice, 2001
 NETPAC Award (Secret Ballot), Venice, 2001
 Best Director, Valladolid Film Festival, 2001
 FIPRESCI Prize, Special Mention, London Film Festival, 2001
 Best Feature (Secret Ballot), Newport Film Festival, 2002
 FIPRESCI Prize, Tromsø Film Festival, 2003

See also
Iranian cinema

References

External links

 Babak Payami's official web-site

Iranian film directors
Iranian expatriates in Canada
Canadian people of Iranian descent
People from Tehran
1966 births
Living people
Venice Best Director Silver Lion winners
Asian-Canadian filmmakers
Canadian documentary film directors